Hameer is a nocturnal Hindustani classical  nominally placed in Kalyan . All the ( (natural notes) along with ( are used in it. Its  is "Shadav Sampurn". "Vadi Svar" is Dhaivat (Dh) and Samvadi Swar is Gandhar.

The Carnatic raaga named Hameer Kalyani is similar to Hindusthani raag Kedar, not to Hindusthani Hamir. Carnatic music also has a separate raaga named Kedaram. As it happens, the Hindusthani raagas Kedar, Kamod and Hameer have fairly strong genetic overlap; in Kedar, madhyama is prominet; in Kamod it is Pancham; and in Hameer it is dhaivat which is most dominant.

Ascent and descent 

In the ascent, all natural notes are used, sometimes adding F#. A feature during the descent is the series of  'Pa ga ma re sa' (G E F D C). At times,  (B flat) is also used as in "Dha ni Pa" during the descent. The general ascent and descent of the notes is:

                   Sa Re Sa, Ga Ma Dha, Ni Dha Sa
                   C  D  C, E  F  A, B  A   C

                   Sa Ni Dha Pa, ma Pa Dha Pa, Ga Ma Re Sa
                   C  B  A   G, F# G  A   G, E  F  D  C

Organization and relationships

Samay (time) 
The time to sing this raga is 2nd  of night i.e. 9:00pm–12:00am.

Film Songs

Tamil

Language:Hindi 
 The song 'duniyaa hammare pyaar kii', from film Lahore (1949), sung by Karan Diwan and Lata Mangeshkar, and composed by Shyam Sunder, is set to Hameer.
 The song from the movie Kohinoor, 'Madhuban mein Radhika Nachi re' is composed in the Hameer raga.
 Vasant Prabhu had a composed a song 'gaa re kokila, gaa', for Marathi film Baayakochaa Bhaauu, set to Hameer, sung by Asha Bhosle.

Notes

References 
 

Hindustani ragas